Players and pairs who neither have high enough rankings nor receive wild cards may participate in a qualifying tournament held one week before the annual Wimbledon Tennis Championships.

Seeds

  Michelle Jaggard (second round)
  Renata Barański (qualifying competition, lucky loser)
  Pascale Etchemendy (qualifying competition, lucky loser)
  Iva Budařová (second round)
  Kristin Godridge (first round)
  Pascale Paradis (first round)
  Jennifer Santrock (qualifying competition, lucky loser)
  Kirrily Sharpe (second round)
  Karin Kschwendt (qualified)
  Katrina Adams (qualified)
  Eva Pfaff (qualified)
  Carling Bassett-Seguso (first round)
  Elena Brioukhovets (qualified)
  Hellas ter Riet (second round)
  Jill Hetherington (first round)
  Kate Gompert (first round)

Qualifiers

  Ann Devries
  Karin Kschwendt
  Eva Pfaff
  Heather Ludloff
  Elena Brioukhovets
  Katrina Adams
  Rennae Stubbs
  Robyn Field

Lucky losers

  Anna Ivan
  Pascale Etchemendy
  Jennifer Santrock
  Renata Barański

Qualifying draw

First qualifier

Second qualifier

Third qualifier

Fourth qualifier

Fifth qualifier

Sixth qualifier

Seventh qualifier

Eighth qualifier

External links

1990 Wimbledon Championships on WTAtennis.com
1990 Wimbledon Championships – Women's draws and results at the International Tennis Federation

Women's Singles Qualifying
Wimbledon Championship by year – Women's singles qualifying
Wimbledon Championships